Gromovo is a rural locality (a village) in Nikolotorzhskoye Rural Settlement, Kirillovsky District, Vologda Oblast, Russia. The population was 11 as of 2002.

Geography 
Gromovo is located 38 km southeast of Kirillov (the district's administrative centre) by road. Paunino is the nearest rural locality.

References 

Rural localities in Kirillovsky District